"Lick a Shot" is a 1994 UK exclusive single by American hip hop group Cypress Hill. The song originally appeared on the group's second album, Black Sunday. The song was interpolated at the end of the Korn song "Blind".

Track listing

Charts

References

1993 songs
1994 singles
Cypress Hill songs
Ruffhouse Records singles
Columbia Records singles
Hardcore hip hop songs
Songs written by DJ Muggs
Songs written by B-Real
Song recordings produced by DJ Muggs